Agonopterix curvipunctosa is a moth of the family Depressariidae. It is found in most of Europe, except Ireland, Portugal, Finland, the Baltic region and the western and southern part of the Balkan Peninsula.

Adults are on wing from mid August to May.

The larvae feed on Anthriscus caucalis, Anthriscus sylvestris, Chaerophyllum temulum, Angelica sylvestris, Angelica archangelica and Seseli libanotica. The species overwinters as an adult.

References

External links
 
 Lepiforum.de

Agonopterix
Moths described in 1811
Moths of Europe
Taxa named by Adrian Hardy Haworth